Ross Warner may refer to:

Ross Warner (rugby league) (1943–2020 ), Australian rugby league player for North Sydney
Ross Warner (footballer) (born 1944), Australian rules footballer for Richmond
Ross Warner (Neighbours), fictional character from Neighbours